The 29th Genie Awards were held on April 4, 2009, to honour Canadian films released in 2008. The ceremony was held at the Canadian Aviation Museum in Ottawa, Ontario, and was broadcast on Global and IFC. The ceremony was hosted by Dave Foley.

Nominations were announced on February 10, 2009, and were led by Quebec films. The Necessities of Life received eight nominations followed by Everything Is Fine with seven. Historical epic Passchendaele had the most wins at five Genies and was also recognized with the Golden Reel as the highest-grossing Canadian film.

Host city and venue

The 29th Genie Awards were held in Ottawa, Canada's capital, in a move suggested by the National Capital Commission (NCC).  The awards had previously only been held in Toronto, aside from two ceremonies in Montreal in the mid-1990s.  The Ontario provincial government invested $150,000 to help the NCC host the Genie Awards and Genie Week, to bring national attention to tourist attractions in the capital region.

The venue chosen for the awards ceremony was the Canadian Aviation Museum (now the Canada Aviation and Space Museum).  Gordon Pinsent and Caroline Neron announced the nominations at the museum on February 10, 2009.  On March 30, Dave Foley was named to host the ceremony.

Genie Week

A new feature of this year's awards was Genie Week of 20 events over 8 days, leading up to the awards ceremony on April 4.  Events were arranged by the Genie Host Organizing Committee, the NCC and the Academy of Canadian Cinema & Television (ACCT).

The Canadian War Museum presented a free screening of Passchendaele, followed by a question and answer session and a tour of trench warfare exhibits. The Canadian Aviation Museum was transformed into a drive-in theatre for a screening of Amal. Screenings of other best-picture nominees were held at Centrepointe Theatre, Arts Court, the Canadian Museum of Civilization, and the Canadian Museum of Nature, along with talks and cultural events.

Library and Archives Canada (LAC) hosted lunchtime screenings of Best Animated Short and Best Live Action Short nominees throughout the week, and offered tours of its film preservation centre and extensive film collections.

Specially designated Via Rail Genie trains brought nominees, industry members and special guests from Toronto and Montreal, with a red carpet reception on their arrival in Ottawa on April 3.

Ceremony

While lacking the extravagance of the Toronto events, the Ottawa ceremony was considered a smart and stylish event. Guy Buller, president of ACTRA's Ottawa chapter, wrote that the museum's collection of vintage aircraft lent a sense of "history, endeavour and pride" to the ceremony.

The awards ceremony was followed by a gala at the Canadian War Museum.

On the red carpet, one presenter suggested that they had dressed down in response to Prime Minister Stephen Harper's election comment that his constituents didn't care about fancy art galas.

Advocacy

The venue was located minutes from Parliament Hill, and there were calls from presenters and other celebrities for Harper's Conservative government to increase support for Canadian film and other cultural industries, particularly for the Canadian Broadcasting Corporation (CBC).  On the red carpet, Foley advocated that Canadian theatres be required to show a proportion of domestic films, as is the case in France and Great Britain.

Presenter Wendy Crewson joked that the after party would be held at the Prime Minister's residence, where she would be on a barricade with a bullhorn.

Heritage Minister James Moore received an invitation but declined to attend. A writer for The Globe and Mail noted no Conservative politicians at the event, though Liberal MPs Pablo Rodríguez and Martha Hall Findlay were at the ceremony. Rodriguez was a vocal critic of Heritage policy.

Jay Stone of The National Post wrote that Kristin Booth's supporting actress win was a "vindication" for Young People Fucking, a film which was at the centre of the Bill C-10 controversy of the previous year. During the previous year's ceremony, several speakers had criticized the bill.

Awards
Winners are listed first and highlighted in boldface:

Telecast 

The awards were broadcast on Global and IFC on April 4 at 9 pm (ET).
The broadcast was lengthened to ninety minutes, compared to the previous year's one-hour show.

References

External links 
29th Genie Awards

Genie Awards
Genie Awards
Genie Awards
Gen